Susanne Becher is a German former competitive figure skater. As a single skater, she is a three-time World Junior silver medalist, a two-time German national medalist, and finished as high as 5th at the European Championships, in 1987. She also briefly competed in pair skating with Stefan Pfrengle.

Results

Single skating

Pairs with Pfrengle

References 

German female single skaters
Living people
World Junior Figure Skating Championships medalists
Year of birth missing (living people)